In Greek mythology, Tegyrios was a King of Thrace.

Mythology 
Tegyrios welcomed the exiled Eumolpus and married his daughter to Eumolpus' son Ismarus. Eumolpus then planned to overthrow him. Tegyrios banished him, but later, after the death of Ismarus, Tegyrios forgave Eumolpus and pronounced him his successor.

Note

Reference 

 Apollodorus, The Library with an English Translation by Sir James George Frazer, F.B.A., F.R.S. in 2 Volumes, Cambridge, MA, Harvard University Press; London, William Heinemann Ltd. 1921. ISBN 0-674-99135-4. Online version at the Perseus Digital Library. Greek text available from the same website.

Mythological kings of Thrace
Kings in Greek mythology
Greek mythology of Thrace